CP4 may refer to:

 CP4 (classification), a disability sport classification specific to cerebral palsy
 an agrobacterium strain that is resistant to glyphosate and was the source for the CP4 EPSPS gene that is used in glyphosate-resistant genetically modified crops
 a class of chemically peculiar stars
 one of the Network Rail Control Periods
 CP4, a specific complex projective space
 cP4, the Pearson symbol used in crystallography to describe a specific cubic crystal structure with four atoms in the unit cell
 CP4: an EEG electrode site according to the 10-20 system
 Punggol MRT/LRT station, MRT station code CP4